Determinism is the philosophical position that for every event there exist conditions that could cause it. 

Determinism has many meanings in different fields:

Philosophy
 Determinism
 Deterministic system (philosophy)
 Economic determinism in philosophy of history
 Historical determinism
 Linguistic determinism
 Logical determinism
 Retrospective determinism
 Scientific determinism
 Theological determinism

Physics
 Superdeterminism

Computer science
 Deterministic algorithm
 Deterministic automaton
 Deterministic finite automaton

Sociology and anthropology
 Cultural determinism
 Environmental determinism
 Social determinism
 Technological determinism
 Nominative determinism

Biology
 Biological determinism
 Genetic determinism
 Determinism theory of hematopoiesis

Environmental geography
 Climatic determinism

Mathematics
 Deterministic system 
 Determinacy in set theory and game theory

Entertainment and media
 Determinism (film), a 2011 American crime drama film

See also
 Determination
 Indeterminacy (disambiguation)
 Determiner in linguistics
 Determinable (disambiguation)